The New Caledonian ground dove (Pampusana longitarsus) is a large, extinct species of Pampusana ground dove in the pigeon family, and the largest member of its genus.  It was endemic to the island of New Caledonia in Melanesia in the south-west Pacific region.  It was described from subfossil bones found at the Pindai Caves paleontological site on the west coast of Grande Terre.  The specific epithet refers to the slender and elongated tarsometatarsus, or lower leg bone, of the species.

References

Pampusana
Extinct birds of New Caledonia
Holocene extinctions
Birds described in 1989
Taxa named by Jean-Christophe Balouet